Ro60-0213 (Org 35032) is a drug developed by Hoffmann–La Roche, which acts as a potent and selective agonist for the 5-HT2C serotonin receptor, with more than 100x selectivity over other closely related serotonin receptor subtypes, and little or no affinity at other receptors. It was developed as a potential antidepressant, but was discontinued from clinical development at an early stage due to toxicity concerns. However the high selectivity of Ro60-0213 for 5-HT2C makes it of continued interest for research into serotonin receptors.

See also 
 5-MeO-AMT
 AL-34662
 AL-38022A
 Ro60-0175
 VER-3323
 YM-348

References 

Serotonin receptor agonists
Hoffmann-La Roche brands
Indenes